Warsaw breakage syndrome is a rare genetic condition. Fewer than 10 cases have been reported by 2018. Its clinical manifestations affect several organ systems.

Presentation

These include
 Severe pre- and postnatal growth retardation
 Microcephaly
 Intellectual disability
 Dysmorphic features
 Small and elongated face
 Narrow bifrontal diameter
 Prominent cheeks
 Small nares
 Flat philtrum
 Relatively large mouth
 Bilateral epicanthal folds
 High arched palate
 Microretrognathism
 Coloboma of the optic disc
 Strabismus
 Cup-shaped ears
 Sensorineural deafness
 Short neck
 Jugular hypoplasia
 Cardiac features
 Ventricular septal defect
 Tetralogy of Fallot
 Sketelal features
 Clinodactyly of the fifth fingers
 Syndactyly of the second and third toes
 Small thumbs
 Small fibulae
 Others
 Abnormal skin pigmentation
 Single palmar crease

Genetics

This condition is caused by mutations in the DDX11 gene which is located on the short arm of chromosome 12 (12p11).
This gene encodes an iron-sulfur containing DNA helicase that belongs to the superfamily 2 of helicases. This protein interacts with the 9-1-1 checkpoint complex protein.

The inheritance pattern is autosomal recessive.

Diagnosis

The diagnosis may be suspected on clinical grounds and can be confirmed by sequencing the DDX11 gene.

Differential diagnosis
The DDX should be based on the following:
 Bloom syndrome
 Cornelia de Lange syndrome
 Fanconi anemia
 Nijmegen breakage syndrome
 Roberts syndrome
 Xeroderma pigmentosum

Treatment

There is no known curative treatment for this condition presently. Management is supportive.

History

This condition was first described in 2010.

References

Genetic diseases and disorders
Rare diseases